The 2012 Portsmouth City Council elections took place on Thursday 3 May 2012 to elect members of Portsmouth City Council in Hampshire, England. One third of the council (14 seats) was contested using the first-past-the-post voting system. The ruling Liberal Democrats won a majority of the seats being contested, and remained in overall control of the council.

After the election, the composition of the council was:
 Liberal Democrats: 26
 Conservatives: 12
 Labour: 4

Election result
All comparisons are to the 2008 local elections, at which the same tranche of seats were last elected.

Ward results
Comparisons for the purpose of determining a gain, hold or loss of a seat, and for all percentage changes, is to the last time these specific seats were up for election in 2008.

References

Portsmouth City Council - Statement of Persons Nominated

2012
2012 English local elections
2010s in Hampshire